Events from 1987 in England

Incumbent

Events

 31 August – Docklands Light Railway is formally opened by the Queen and Prince Philip.

Births

6 January – Gemma Gibbons, judoka
1 June – Billy Beechers, former professional footballer
29 August – Elliot Benyon, footballer

See also
1987 in Northern Ireland
1987 in Scotland
1987 in Wales

References

 
England
Years of the 20th century in England
1980s in England